Boldinsky is a rural locality (a settlement) in Nachalovsky Selsoviet, Privolzhsky District, Astrakhan Oblast, Russia. The population was 190 as of 2010. There are 11 streets.

Geography 
Boldinsky is located 9 km southeast of Nachalovo (the district's administrative centre) by road. Kilinchi is the nearest rural locality.

References 

Rural localities in Privolzhsky District, Astrakhan Oblast